Lisa Zwerling is an American physician (member of the American Medical Association), television writer and producer (member of the Writers Guild of America & the Producers Guild of America). She has worked on the medical drama series Presidio Med and ER and science fiction series FlashForward.

Biography

Zwerling began her television career as a technical advisor and writer for the medical drama Presidio Med. The series was canceled before completing its first season. Presidio Med was created and executive produced by John Wells. Following the conclusion of Presidio Med Wells hired Zwerling as a story editor for the tenth season of long running medical drama ER. She made her writing debut for the series with the episode "NICU".

Zwerling returned for the eleventh season as an executive story editor. She wrote a further four episodes - "An Intern's Guide To The Galaxy", "Middleman", "Back in the World", and "Ruby Redux". "Back in the World" was co-written with executive producer and show runner David Zabel. "Ruby Redux" was co-written with executive producer Lydia Woodward.

For the twelfth season Zwerling became a producer, initially being credited as a co-producer. Zwerling co-wrote the season opener "Canon City" with Wells and co-executive producer Joe Sachs. She co-wrote a further episode, "Quintessence of Dust", again with Zabel, and scripted a third episode "Lost in America" on her own.

She was promoted for the thirteenth season becoming a producer and contributing a further five episodes - "Graduation Day" (with executive producer Janine Sherman Barrois), "Scoop and Run", "City of Mercy" (with Zabel), "Crisis of Conscience", and "Sea Change".

She garnered more responsibility for the fourteenth season becoming a supervising producer and writing a further five episodes including the season finale. She collaborated with staff writer Karen Maser on "In A Different Light" - Zwerling's first episode collaborating with a junior writer. She also wrote "The Test", "Atonement", "Truth Will Out" (again with Maser), and season finale "The Chicago Way" with David Zabel.

Zwerling is currently a co-executive producer and writer on the fifteenth and final season of ER. She wrote the second episode of the season "Another Thursday at County." She also co-wrote "The Book of Abby" (again with Zabel) which was the final episode of long-serving series star Maura Tierney who plays Abby Lockhart.

After the conclusion of ER, she joined the crew of new ABC science fiction series FlashForward in 2009. Zwerling served as a co-executive producer and writer for the series. The show focuses on a team of FBI agents following a global consciousness blackout that gives people a vision of their futures. The series was created by Brannon Braga and David S. Goyer both of whom also served as executive producers. Zwerling co-wrote five episodes for the first season. She co-wrote the episode "Black Swan" with Scott M. Gimple. She co-wrote the episode "The Gift" with Ian Goldberg. She co-wrote the episode "Blowback" with Barbara Nance. She co-wrote the episode "The Garden of Forking Paths" with Goyer.
She co-wrote the seasons penultimate episode "Countdown" with Seth Hoffman.

Fox has handed a late pilot order to Weekend at Bellevue, a medical drama from former ER writer-producer Lisa Zwerling and BermanBraun (Lloyd Braun/Gail Berman). The project, centered on a psychiatrist in charge of the weekend shift of Bellevue Hospital psychiatric unit, was originally set up at NBC and UMS earlier this season. After the network recently passed on the script, it was taken to Fox. Weekend at Bellevue is based on Dr. Julie Holland's memoir about her nine-year stint as the weekend physician in charge of the psychiatric emergency room at the oldest public hospital in the United States whose name has become synonymous with insanity. Zwerling, Gail Berman, Lloyd Braun and Gene Stein are executive producing. In 2018, Zwerling and Karyn Usher will showrun the TV series The Rook.

Filmography

Producer

Writer

References

External links

NBC official site

21st-century American physicians
American television writers
American television producers
American women television producers
Living people
American women television writers
Place of birth missing (living people)
Year of birth missing (living people)
21st-century American women writers
21st-century American screenwriters